Terrance Woodbury (born June 16, 1987) is an American professional basketball player who plays for the Kumamoto Volters of the B.League. Born in Norfolk, Virginia, he played at Granby High School in Norfolk, with his senior season at Coastal Christian Academy in Virginia Beach, Virginia. He then played college basketball at the University of Georgia.

Professional
Woodbury went undrafted in the 2009 NBA draft and subsequently did not play professionally in 2009–10. In 2010, he joined AZS Koszalin of Poland but left before the start of the regular season. In December 2010, he joined Oberwart Gunners of Austria but left before appearing in a game for them. In January 2011, he joined LF Basket of Sweden for the rest of the 2010–11 season. In November 2011, he was acquired by the Austin Toros. In 2012, he joined Ryukyu Golden Kings Okinawa of Japan for the 2012–13 season. Following the conclusion of the Japanese season, he joined Leones de Santo Domingo of the Dominican Republic. In November 2013, he was re-acquired by the Austin Toros.

References

External links
Profile at Eurobasket.com
Stats in Japan

1987 births
Living people
American expatriate basketball people in Austria
American expatriate basketball people in Japan
American expatriate basketball people in Poland
American expatriate basketball people in Sweden
Austin Toros players
Bambitious Nara players
Basketball players from Virginia
Georgia Bulldogs basketball players
Kagawa Five Arrows players
Kumamoto Volters players
Ryukyu Golden Kings players
Shiga Lakes players
San-en NeoPhoenix players
Sportspeople from Virginia Beach, Virginia
American men's basketball players
Small forwards
Shooting guards